Al-Najma Sport Club is a Saudi Arabian football team based in Unaizah that is currently playing in the Saudi Second Division League. Founded in 1960, the team plays in white and black color and green colours.

Al-Najma has a fierce rivalry with local club Al-Arabi, which is usually manifested in the Unaizah Derby.

1997–1998 Saudi Premier League 
The best achievement by the team, is finished third for the Saudi Premier League 1997-98 And entering the semi-finals.

Honours
Saudi First Division League
Winners (2): 1989–90, 1993–94
Runners-up (1): 1991–92

Current squad 

As of Saudi Second Division:

Notable players
Mansour Al-Mousa
Abdulaziz Al-Aazmi
Abdulaziz Alsibyani
Abdurahman Al-Khaibari
Marzouk Al-Otaibi
Mohamed Husain
Zamil Al-Sulim
Saad Al-Zahrani
Ahmed Al-Suhail
Mesfer Al-Qahtani

Coaches history 
 Rabah Saâdane
 Youssef Zouaoui
 Christov Andenov (1997–99)
 Dudu Georgescu (2001)
 Dobromir Zhechev (2001–02)

Presidents
 Abdulrahman Al-Mashari
 Muhammed Salih Al-Subaie
 Ibrahim Mansour Al-Maiman
 Ibrahim Ali Al-Nhabiy
 Saleh Abdulaziz Al-Wassel
 Saleh Al-Sowyan
 Saleh Abdulaziz Al-Wassel (Return)
 Ibrahim Al-Sufi (Currently)

See also

Unaizah

References

External links

 goalzz
 Official site 

Najma
Association football clubs established in 1960
Unaizah
1960 establishments in Saudi Arabia
Football clubs in Unaizah